Mauri Antero Numminen (born 12 March 1940 in Somero, Southwest Finland) is a Finnish artist who has worked in several different fields of music and culture.

Biography
In the 1960s, Numminen was known particularly as an avantgarde, underground artist, stirring controversy with such songs as Nuoren aviomiehen on syytä muistaa ("What a young husband should remember"; the lyrics of the song were taken directly from a guide to newly married couples, and included advice on foreplay) and Naiseni kanssa eduskuntatalon puistossa ("With my woman at the parliament house's park"). He was also a member of the band Suomen Talvisota 1939-1940. In his early days Numminen often successfully provoked people, for example with his interpretations of Franz Schubert's lieder, sung with his own idiosyncratically creaking voice, or creating a scandal at the Jyväskylän kesä festival of Jyväskylä in 1966 with his song lyrics taken from a sex guide. Numminen also composed music to the writings of the philosopher Ludwig Wittgenstein. In 1966, Numminen collaborated with Pekka Gronow to found the record label Eteenpäin! ("Forward!") to release Numminen's own music. Later Numminen records were published under the umbrella of the legendary Finnish label Love Records.

Numminen has been one of the unsung pioneers of Finnish electronic music. He is known for his collaborations with composer and inventor Erkki Kurenniemi who built him a "singing machine" Numminen used to participate in a singing contest in 1964, and the electronic instrument Sähkökvartetti ("the Electric Quartet") in the late 1960s, the performance of which wreaked havoc in a youth festival in Sofia, Bulgaria. The Sähkökvartetti can be heard on Numminen's track 'Kaukana väijyy ystäviä' (1968).

In 1970 Numminen founded the jazz band Uusrahvaanomainen Jatsiorkesteri ("the Neo-Vulgar Jazz Orchestra") with pianist Jani Uhlenius, taking its cues from the 1920s–1940s jazz, swing, foxtrot, etc. Past members of the band include Aaro Kurkela, Kalevi Viitamäki, Jari Lappalainen and Heikki "Häkä" Virtanen. As of 2020, the band's line-up consists of Numminen, Uhlenius, accordion player Pedro Hietanen and contrabassist Pekka Sarmanto.

In the 1970s, Numminen became a popular favourite with his children's songs in the 1973 film Herra Huu – Jestapa Jepulis, Penikat Sipuliks, where he also played the main role, and in the 1977 TV series Jänikset maailmankartalle where he played a hare. At the same time, Numminen also gained success in Sweden with his song 'Gummiboll' (Numminen's Finnish version of this was called 'Kumipallona luokses pompin ain', and is an interpretation of the song "Rubber Ball" by Bobby Vee): Numminen has recorded Swedish versions of many of his songs. He has also made several songs in English, German and Esperanto.

In 1989 Numminen released the vinyl album The Tractatus Suite, consisting of extracts from the philosopher Ludwig Wittgenstein's Tractatus Logico-Philosophicus set to music, on the Forward! label (GN-95). The album was recorded at Finnvox Studios, Helsinki between February and June 1989. The "lyrics" (quotations from the Tractatus) were provided in German, English, Esperanto, French, Finnish and Swedish. The music was reissued as a CD in 2003, M.A. Numminen sings Wittgenstein.

In the 2000s, Numminen made a return to electronic music and modern club sound. In 2003 Numminen started M.A.N. Scratch Band featuring his long-time collaborator Pedro Hietanen with young jazz musicians Olavi Uusivirta, Lasse Lindgren and DJ Santeri Vuosara (also known as DJ Sane). The duo M.A. Numminen & DJ Sane was started in 2004.

Numminen has appeared on Radio Suomi since 1984 together with playwright Juha Siltanen on their night show Yömyöhä. In 1986 he published a book called Baarien mies ("The Man of the Bars") on Finnish keskiolut lager culture, for which he visited 350 bars around Finland. The book had a considerable role in the birth of 1980s keskiolut beer culture in Finland.

Numminen has taken part in over 30 films, either as an actor, scriptwriter, composer or cinematographer.

Compilations discography

 Uudet lastenlaulut 1 (1974)
 M.A. Nummisen suosituimmat (1974)
 M.A. Nummisen 60-luku (1985)
 Den flygande mannen (EMI 1985)
 The Tractatus Suite (Forward! 1989)
 Klassikot – Ne Parhaat (Castle Finland 1990)
 Den eviga årgången – M.A. Numminens bästa (Amigo 1990)
 Suosituimmat lastenlaulut (EMI 1998)
 Kiusankappaleita 1: 1966–70 (Siboney Records 2000)
 Kiusankappaleita 2: 1973–88 (Siboney 2001)
 Kiusankappaleita 3: 1989–2001 (Siboney 2001)
 Dägä Dägä Finnwelten (Trikont 2001)
 Valtava Jänis – Gommin ja Pommin kaikki seikkailut (EMI 2002)
 Suomihuiput – lastenlaulut (EMI 2005)
 M.A. Numminen sings Wittgenstein (Zweitausendeins EFA SP 142 2003)
 Tunnelmassa – M.A.Nummisen Uusrahvaanomaisen Jatsiorkesterin parhaat (Love Records 2012)

Bibliography

 Kauneimmat runot 1970
 Lastuja 1971
 Satuja 1975
 Jänikset maailmankartalle! 1977
 Terässinfonia (together with Esa Saarinen) 1981
 Passio Libertatis 1983
 Baarien mies 1986
 Kirjeitä virolaiselle runoilijalle 1987
 Etsivätoimisto Andrejev & Milton (together with Markku Into) 1991
 Tango on intohimoni 1998
 Helsinkiin 1999
 Der Weihnachtsmann schlägt zurück 2001
 Naapuri (together with Markku Into and Jarkko Laine) 2002
 Rehtorin päiväkirja – Interaktiivinen kalenteri vuodelle 2004 2003

References

External links
 Official website
 Unofficial discography
 M.A. Numminen @ pHinnWeb

1940 births
Living people
People from Somero
20th-century Finnish male singers
Writers from Southwest Finland
Finnish writers
Finnish tango musicians
Finnish Esperantists